Middle Lake may refer to:

Canada
 Middle Lake, Saskatchewan, a village
 Middle Lake (Nova Scotia), a lake in Richmond County

United States
 Middle Lake (Bradley County, Arkansas), a lake of Bradley County, Arkansas
 Middle Lake Trail, a hiking trail in Eagle County, Colorado
 Middle Lake (Independence Township, Michigan), a lake
 Middle Lake, a lake in Nicollet County, Minnesota

See also 
 Middle Lakes, Argyle, Nova Scotia, Canada